François Calvet (born 1 April 1953 in Perpignan) is a French politician, a member of the National Assembly.  He represents the Pyrénées-Orientales department,  and is a member of the Union for a Popular Movement. On 25 September 2011 he was elected senator of the Pyrénées-Orientales and therefore leaves the National Assembly. His deputy is Jean-Pierre Romero, mayor of Port-Vendres. He is a member of the Study Group on the question of Tibet of National Assembly.

References

1953 births
Living people
People from Perpignan
The Republicans (France) politicians
Republican Party (France) politicians
Liberal Democracy (France) politicians
Union for French Democracy politicians
Union for a Popular Movement politicians
French Senators of the Fifth Republic
Mayors of places in Occitania (administrative region)
Deputies of the 12th National Assembly of the French Fifth Republic
Deputies of the 13th National Assembly of the French Fifth Republic
Senators of Pyrénées-Orientales